Sajikot Waterfall is a waterfall located in Havelian Tehsil, Abbottabad District, in Pakistan's Khyber Pakhtunkhwa Province. It is a popular tourist destination in Abbottabad District. A newly constructed narrow road from Havelian to Sajikot allows visitors to take their cars right at the top of the waterfall.

See also
List of waterfalls of Pakistan

References 

Waterfalls of Pakistan
Landforms of Khyber Pakhtunkhwa
Tourist attractions in Khyber Pakhtunkhwa
Abbottabad District